The Château de Falgueyrac is a château located in the commune of Saint-Chamassy in Dordogne, Aquitaine, France, in the Perigord Noir, seven kilometers from Le Bugue, and two kilometers from Le Buisson-de-Cadouin. 

It was constructed in the 17th century, and modified and enlarged in the 19th century. 

Châteaux in Dordogne